Recruitee is a business producing or selling computer "software as a service "(Saas.) The software functions as an applicant tracking system for handling applications for jobs. It includes a careers site editing system for employer branding, a plugin for sourcing (personnel) (otherwise called recruitment), employment website integration, email and calendar synchronization. Within 4 months of its public launch in August 2015, Recruitee attracted over 1000 small and medium-sized enterprises (SMEs) and recruiting agencies worldwide.

History
In 2011, Perry Oostdam met Pawel Smoczyk on Founder2be, a social network that helps aspiring entrepreneurs find their co-founder. Working remotely from the Netherlands and Poland, they put together their first product - a mobile activation game called GeoRun.

In 2014, Oostdam and Smoczyk changed the business and built Recruitee out of their own frustration with the hassles of hiring. They believe hiring should be a team effort, not only for founders and HR alone.

After its launch, Recruitee quickly became popular and got an undisclosed amount of seed funding on September 1, 2015. Its board members include Dutch entrepreneurs Robert Pijselman and Luc Brandts.

In November 2015, Recruitee announced a partnership with Rockstart, a company in Amsterdam. Recruitee set up a Talent Pool that let applicants apply to job openings from all startup businesses that are and were affiliated with Rockstart.

Recruitee's current clients include Usabilla, and Vlisco.

Features
Users can customize the hiring pipeline for each job opening. Users can drag and drop candidates' profiles to different stages as they move along the hiring process.

Recognition
In February 2016, Inc. (magazine) named Recruitee as one of the five apps that boost recruiting and retention for companies of any size.
In August 2016, Entrepreneur (magazine) mentions Recruitee as a tool to strengthen employer branding.
 Capterra's Top 10 Most User-Friendly Applicant Tracking Software  and Top 20 Most Affordable Applicant Tracking Software

References

External links
Official Website
Applicant Tracking System

Business software
Recruitment software
Cloud applications
Application software
Privately held companies of the Netherlands